The 2022 Southeastern Conference football season is the 90th season of Southeastern Conference (SEC) football, taking place during the 2022 NCAA Division I FBS football season. The season began on August 27, 2022 and is scheduled to end with the 2022 SEC Championship Game on December 3, 2022. The SEC is a Power Five conference as part of the College Football Playoff system.

Previous season
Alabama defeated Georgia 41–24 in the 2021 SEC Championship Game.

Alabama and Georgia were selected to play in the 2022 College Football Playoff. No. 1 Alabama defeated No. 4 Cincinnati 27–6 in the Cotton Bowl Classic CFP semifinal game. No. 3 Georgia defeated No. 2 Michigan 34–11 in the Orange Bowl CFP semifinal game. Alabama and Georgia met on January 10, 2022, at Lucas Oil Stadium in Indianapolis, Indiana in a rematch of the 2021 SEC Championship game and 2018 College Football Playoff National Championship to play for the 2022 College Football Playoff National Championship. Georgia defeated Alabama 33–18, winning their third national championship in school history and their first since 1980.

Eleven other SEC teams accepted invitations to bowl games, but Texas A&M was unable to play in the Gator Bowl due to injuries and sickness from COVID-19, so only 10 teams played in their bowl games.

Results from the rest of the SEC bowl games:

South Carolina defeated North Carolina 38–21 in the Duke's Mayo Bowl.
Arkansas defeated Penn State 24–10 in the Outback Bowl.
Kentucky defeated Iowa 20–17 in the Citrus Bowl.
Missouri lost to Army 24–22 in the Armed Forces Bowl.
Florida lost to UCF 29–17 in the Gasparilla Bowl.
Auburn lost to Houston 17–13 in the Birmingham Bowl.
Mississippi State lost to Texas Tech 34–7 in the Liberty Bowl.
Tennessee lost to Purdue 48–45 in overtime in the Music City Bowl.
Ole Miss lost to Baylor 21–7 in the Sugar Bowl.
Louisiana State lost to Kansas State 42–20 in the TaxAct Texas Bowl.

Preseason
2022 SEC Spring Football and number of signees on signing day:

East Division
Georgia –
Florida –
Kentucky –
Missouri –
South Carolina –
Tennessee –
Vanderbilt -

West Division
Alabama –
Arkansas –
Auburn –
LSU –
Mississippi State –
Ole Miss –
Texas A&M -

Recruiting classes

SEC Media Days

The 2022 SEC Media days will be held on July 18–21, 2022 at College Football Hall of Fame and The Omni Atlanta Hotel at CNN Center in Atlanta, GA. The Preseason Polls will be released in July 2022. Each team had their head coach available to talk to the media at the event. Coverage of the event was televised on SEC Network and ESPN.

The teams and representatives in respective order were as follows:

 SEC Commissioner – Greg Sankey
 Monday July 18
 LSU – Brian Kelly (HC), Jack Bech (WR), Mike Jones Jr. (LB) and BJ Ojulari (DE)
 Ole Miss – Lane Kiffin (HC), Jonathan Mingo (WR), Cedric Johnson (DE) and Nick Broeker (OL)
 Missouri  - Eliah Drinkwitz (HC),  Barrett Banister (WR), Martez Manuel (DB) and Isaiah McGuire (DL)
 Tuesday July 19
 Alabama – Nick Saban (HC), Bryce Young (QB), Jordan Battle (DL) and Will Anderson Jr. (LB)
 Mississippi State – Mike Leach (HC), Jaden Crumedy (DT), Nathaniel Watson (LB) and Austin Williams (WR)
 South Carolina – Shane Beamer (HC), Jovaughn Gwyn (OL), Dakereon Joyner (WR), Zacch Pickens (DL)
 Vanderbilt – Clark Lea (HC), Ben Bresnahan (TE), Anfernee Orji (LB) and Mike Wright (QB)
 Wednesday July 20
 Arkansas – Sam Pittman (HC), Jalen Catalon (S), KJ Jefferson (QB) and Bumper Pool (LB)
 Florida – Billy Napier (HC), Anthony Richardson (QB), Richard Gouraige (OL) and Ventrell Miller (LB)
 Georgia – Kirby Smart (HC), Stetson Bennett IV (QB), Nolan Smith (LB) and Sedrick Van Pran (OL)
 Kentucky – Mark Stoops (HC), Will Levis (QB), Kenneth Horsey (OG) and DeAndre Square (LB)
 Thursday July 21
 Auburn – Bryan Harsin (HC), Tank Bigsby (RB), Derick Hall (DE) and John Samuel Shenker (TE)
 Tennessee - Josh Heupel (HC), Trevon Flowers (S), Hendon Hooker (QB) and Cedric Tillman (WR)
 Texas A&M  – Jimbo Fisher (HC), Demani Richardson (DB), Layden Robinson (OL) and Ainias Smith (WR)

Preseason media polls

Preseason awards

All−American Teams

Individual awards

Preseason All-SEC

Media

References:

Coaches

References:

Head coaches
There was two coaching changes before the 2022 season.

Coaches
Note: All stats current through the completion of the 2021 season

Mid-season changes
On October 31, Auburn fired head coach Bryan Harsin after posting a 9–12 record with the school over two years. Cadillac Williams was named the interim head coach for the remainder of the season. On November 28, Auburn announced that they had signed Liberty head coach Hugh Freeze to take over their head coaching position beginning in 2023.

Post-season changes
On December 12, Mississippi State head coach Mike Leach died after suffering a major heart attack. Mississippi State still elected to play in their bowl game. Defensive coordinator Zach Arnett was named interim head coach during Leach's hospitalization and promoted to permanent head coach after Leach's death.

Rankings

Regular season
The 2022 schedule was released on September 21, 2021. The season began on August 27, 2022, and will end with the SEC Championship Game on December 3, 2022.

Week Zero

Week One

Week Two

Week Three

Week Four

Week Five

Week Six

Week Seven

Week Eight

Week Nine

Week Ten

Week Eleven

Week Twelve

Week Thirteen

Championship Game

Postseason

Bowl games

For the 2020–2025 bowl cycle, The SEC will have annually eight appearances in the following bowls: Sugar Bowl and Peach Bowl (unless they are selected for playoffs filled by a Big 12 and at-large team if champion is in the playoffs), Citrus Bowl, Gator Bowl, Las Vegas Bowl, Liberty Bowl, Music City Bowl, ReliaQuest Bowl and Texas Bowl. The SEC teams will go to a New Year's Six bowl if a team finishes higher than the champions of Power Five conferences in the final College Football Playoff rankings. The SEC champion are also eligible for the College Football Playoff if they're among the top four teams in the final CFP ranking.

Rankings are from CFP Poll. All times Central Time Zone.

Head to head matchups

Updated with the results of all games through November 2022.

SEC vs Power Five matchups 
The following games include SEC teams competing against Power Five conferences teams from the (ACC, Big Ten, Big 12, BYU/Notre Dame and Pac-12). All rankings are from the AP Poll at the time of the game.

SEC vs Group of Five matchups 
The following games include SEC teams competing against "Group of Five" teams from the American, C-USA, MAC, Mountain West and Sun Belt.

SEC vs FBS independents matchups 
The following games include SEC teams competing against FBS Independents, which includes Army, Liberty, New Mexico State, UConn and UMass.

SEC vs FCS matchups 
The Football Championship Subdivision comprises 13 conferences and two independent programs.
 {| class="wikitable" style="text-align:center"
|-
! Date !!  Visitor !! Home !! Site !! Score
|- style="background:#ccffcc;"
| September 3 || Mercer || Auburn || Jordan-Hare Stadium • Auburn, AL || 42-16
|-
|- style="background:#ccffcc;"
| September 3 || Sam Houston || #6 Texas A&M || Kyle Field • College Station, TX || 31-0
|-
|- style="background:#ccffcc;"
| September 3 || Elon || Vanderbilt || Vanderbilt Stadium • Nashville, TN || 42-31
|-
|- style="background:#ccffcc;"
| September 10 || Southern || LSU || Tiger Stadium • Baton Rouge, LA || 65-17
|-
|- style="background:#ccffcc;"
| September 10 || Central Arkansas || #22 Ole Miss || Vaught-Hemingway Stadium • Oxford, MS || 59-3
|-
|- style="background:#ccffcc;"
| September 10 || Samford || #2 Georgia || Sanford Stadium • Athens, GA || 33-0
|-
|- style="background:#ccffcc;"
| September 17 || Missouri State || #10 Arkansas || Donald W. Reynolds Razorback Stadium • Fayetteville, AR || 38-27
|-
|- style="background:#ccffcc;"
| September 17 || Youngstown State || #9 Kentucky || Kroger Field • Lexington, KY || 31-0
|-
|- style="background:#ccffcc;"
| September 17 || Abilene Christian || Missouri || Faurot Field • Columbia, MO || 34-17
|-
|- style="background:#ccffcc;"
| October 1  || Eastern Washington || Florida || Ben Hill Griffin Stadium • Gainesville, FL || 52-17
|-
|- style="background:#ccffcc;"
| October 1 || South Carolina State || South Carolina || Williams-Brice Stadium • Columbia, SC || 50-10
|-
|- style="background:#ccffcc;"
| October 22 || UT Martin || Tennessee || Neyland Stadium • Knoxville, TN || 65-24
|-
|- style="background:#ccffcc;"
| November 19 || Austin Peay || #8 Alabama || Bryant Denny Stadium • Tuscaloosa, AL || 34-0
|-
|- style="background:#ccffcc;"
| November 19 || ETSU || Mississippi State || Davis Wade Stadium • Starkville, MS || 56-7
|-
|}

Notes 

a. 
Date of game was moved from October 1 to October 2

b. 
Date of game moved from October 1 to September 29

Note:† Denotes Neutral Site Game

SEC Records against other conferences
2022–2023 records against non-conference foes:

Regular Season

Awards and honors

Player of the week honors

Totals per school

SEC individual awards
The following individuals received postseason honors as voted by the SEC Conference football coaches at the end of the season

All-conference teams

The following players earned All-SEC honors. Any teams showing (_) following their name are indicating the number of All-SEC Conference Honors awarded to that university for 1st team and 2nd team respectively.

First Team

Second Team

† Two-time first team selection

Honorable mentions
Alabama:
Arkansas:
Auburn:
Florida:
Georgia:
LSU:
Mississippi State:
Missouri:
Ole Miss:
South Carolina:
Tennessee:
Texas A&M:
Vanderbilt:

All-Americans

Currently, the NCAA compiles consensus all-America teams in the sports of Division I-FBS football and Division I men's basketball using a point system computed from All-America teams named by coaches associations or media sources.  The system consists of three points for a first-team honor, two points for second-team honor, and one point for third-team honor.  Honorable mention and fourth team or lower recognitions are not accorded any points.  College Football All-American consensus teams are compiled by position and the player accumulating the most points at each position is named first team consensus all-American.  Currently, the NCAA recognizes All-Americans selected by the AP, AFCA, FWAA, TSN, and the WCFF to determine Consensus and Unanimous All-Americans. Any player named to the First Team by all five of the NCAA-recognized selectors is deemed a Unanimous All-American.

List of All American Teams
 American Football Coaches Association All-America Team
 Associated Press All-America Team
 CBS Sports All-America Team
 ESPN All-America Team
 Football Writers Association of America All-America Team
 The Athletic All-America Team
 Sporting News 2022 College Football All-America Team
 USA Today All-America Team
 Walter Camp Football Foundation All-America Team

All-Academic
First team

Second team

Honorable mentions
Alabama:
Arkansas:
Auburn:
Florida:
Georgia:
LSU:
Mississippi State:
Missouri:
Ole Miss:
South Carolina:
Tennessee:
Texas A&M:
Vanderbilt:

National award winners
2022 College Football Award Winners

Home game attendance

NFL Draft
The Following list will include all SEC Players drafted in the 2023 NFL Draft

Notes and references